Heinrich Mechling (25 February 1892 – 27 December 1976) was a German international footballer.

References

1892 births
1976 deaths
Association football forwards
German footballers
Germany international footballers
Freiburger FC players